Mazayjan (also Romanized as Mazāyjān; also known as Mazījān) is a city in Mazayjan Rural District, in the Central District of Bavanat County, Fars Province, Iran. At the 2006 census, its population was 3,321, in 899 families.

References 

Populated places in Bavanat County